The list of records in the World Rally Championship includes records and statistics set in the World Rally Championship (WRC) from the 1973 season to present.

Drivers

Wins

Statistics

Age

Manufacturers

Co-drivers

Rallies

Fastest rallies

Closest wins

Nationalities

Drivers

Driver wins per nationalities

Co-drivers

See also

Power Stage (Power Stage statistics)
List of World Rally Championship Drivers' champions
List of World Rally Championship Co-Drivers' champions
List of World Rally Championship Manufacturers' champions
List of World Rally Championship event winners

Notes

References

External links
Statistics at World Rally Archive
RallyBase

World Rally Championship
Records